A students' representative council, also known as a students' administrative council, represents student interests in the government of a university, school or other educational institution. Generally the SRC forms part of a broader students' association, which may include other functions such as societies, entertainments (in the form of a students' union) and sports (in the form of a sports' union). They are most commonly found in Scottish universities. 

Universities may have a statutory obligation to receive representation from the SRC and it is usual for student representatives from the SRC to form part of university structures including the university court, academic senate, and other bodies.

History and presence
Students' representative councils in Scotland were established as part of the system of ancient university governance by the Universities (Scotland) Act 1889 in the four extant universities of the time: Aberdeen, Edinburgh, Glasgow and St Andrews. The existence of an SRC was also incorporated in the royal charter of the University of Dundee, which adheres to the ancient governance structure.

More recently, SRCs have been established at the University of Strathclyde and at Heriot-Watt University's Scottish Borders Campus.

In general, SRCs have been submerged into wider students' associations, which are an umbrella term for various bodies which not only perform representation tasks, but also cater for student welfare, societies, entertainments (in the form of a Students' Union) and sports (in the form of a sports' union). In acknowledgement of this, Aberdeen University Students' Association has elected to use the name Students' Association Council for its SRC, despite its formal and legal title remaining unchanged. An exception to this system is Glasgow University Students' Representative Council which is not part of a Students' Association as a result of the university's retention of its separate male and female students' unions (in the form of the Glasgow University Union and the Queen Margaret Union respectively), although since 1980 both now admit both men and women as full members whilst retaining their separate identities.

Representation
Each university has a statutory obligation to receive representation from the SRC and it is usual for student representatives to be elected by the SRC or student body onto various positions in the main administrative bodies of the institution: the university court, academic senate or general council. The SRC is usually headed by a sabbatical officer elected by the student body, who will usually be paid and take a year out of study to take on the role. Sometimes they will, instead, dedicate a year after completing their studies. In many cases there are a small number of other full-time elected officers. There are also unpaid part-time officers who continue with their studies, and there may be permanent staff members employed to assist in the running of the SRC.

The SRC or its students' association may choose to facilitate a vote on membership of the National Union of Students Scotland or the Coalition of Higher Education Students in Scotland, and it is the students' association, rather than the individual students, which may become a member of one of those bodies.

Students' unions
Higher education in Scotland
1889 establishments in Scotland
1889 in education